Aljon Escalona Mariano (born August 3, 1992) is a Filipino professional basketball player for the Barangay Ginebra San Miguel of the Philippine Basketball Association (PBA). He was drafted with the 16th overall pick in the 2015 PBA draft by the Barangay Ginebra San Miguel.

College career

Rookie season
Mariano joined the Tigers in 2009. Mariano played limited minutes with the Tigers during his first season with the team.

Second season
In his second season, Mariano became a starter for the Tigers, while averaging 7.1 points per game and 3.1 rebounds per game. Unfortunately, the inexperienced Tigers failed to return to the Final Four and finished 7th in the standings at 4–10 ahead of the UP Fighting Maroons.

Injury and return
Mariano sat out the entire season in UAAP Season 74 due to a fractured ankle which kept him out of action for 6 months.

Mariano returned to the Tigers the following season. In a game against the Ateneo Blue Eagles, Mariano scored a career-high 21 points and 13 rebounds as he led the Tigers to snap a 12-game losing streak against the Blue Eagles 71–70. In a game against the De La Salle Green Archers, Mariano scored all of his 15 points in the 4th quarter and in the two overtime periods, including the game-winning basket with 7.1 seconds left as the Tigers defeat the Green Archers in double overtime 84–82. Then in their second round meeting against the NU Bulldogs, Mariano set another career-high 22 points, including the game winner with 4.4 seconds left in overtime as he led the Tigers to an overtime victory against the Bulldogs 58–57. The Tigers were able to advance to the UAAP Final Four as the #2 seed with a 10–4 record in the elimination round, they were able to defeat the NU Bulldogs to advance to the UAAP Finals and faced off against the Ateneo Blue Eagles but were swept in the Finals 2–0 as the Blue Eagles completed their five-peat. Mariano finished the season averaging 13.3 points per game, 7.3 rebounds per game and 2.2 assists per game on 42% shooting from the field, 36% shooting from 3-point range and 67% free throw shooting.

In the Philippine Collegiate Champions League later that year, Mariano would play a key part in the Tigers run in the tournament as they first won the Metro Manila-Luzon tournament by defeating both the Letran Knights and the Adamson Soaring Falcons to enter into the PCCL Final Four with the Ateneo Blue Eagles, San Beda Red Lions and the Southwestern U Cobras. The Tigers would finish with a 2–1 record in the Final Four to set up a rematch with the Blue Eagles in the Finals, where the Tigers exacted their revenge against the Eagles as they were crowned the National Champions after winning the title in a tightly contested three-game series.

Fourth season
In his fourth season with the Tigers, Mariano fought through an ankle injury throughout the season as the Tigers struggled throughout the season after coming off their runner-up finish the previous season and their national championship run. Despite the injury, Mariano would be a key catalyst to the Tigers' run throughout the season as the Tigers made a stunning bid to return UAAP Finals where they battled the De La Salle Green Archers. Mariano however would struggle during the Finals against the Archers. In Game 3 of the Finals, he missed the title-clinching jumper that sent the game into overtime and would turn the ball over in the final moments that led to the title-clinching jumper by Almond Vosotros as the Archers won the title with a Game 3 win over the Tigers 71–69. Mariano ended the season averaging 11.4 points per game, 7.3 rebounds per game and 2.1 assists per game on 40% shooting from the field and 66% shooting from the free throw line.

Final season

In his final season with the Tigers, with new head coach Bong dela Cruz taking the helm from Pido Jarencio, Mariano was named the captain of the Tigers with the departure of Jeric Teng last season. However, the Tigers were riddled with injuries late in the season as Mariano ended his college playing career with the Tigers missing the Final Four. Mariano in his final season with the Tigers averaged 11 points per game, 5.5 rebounds per game, and 1.4 assists per game on 34% shooting from the field and 30% shooting from three-point range.

Professional career
On August 23, 2015, Mariano was drafted by the Barangay Ginebra San Miguel in the 2015 PBA draft as the sixteenth overall pick.

PBA career statistics

As of the end of 2021 season

Season-by-season averages

|-
| align=left | 
| align=left | Barangay Ginebra
| 26 || 10.6 || .460 || .000 || .429 || 2.6 || .5 || .1 || .1 || .3
|-
| align=left | 
| align=left | Barangay Ginebra
| 35 || 10.2 || .462 || .000 || .610 || 2.6 || .3 || .2 || .1 || 3.1
|-
| align=left | 
| align=left | Barangay Ginebra
| 42 || 14.9 || .463 || .250 || .651 || 3.4 || 1.0 || .3 || .1 || 4.9
|-
| align=left | 
| align=left | Barangay Ginebra
| 45 || 11.1 || .468 || .000 || .545 || 2.5 || .9 || .2 || .1 || 3.2
|-
| align=left | 
| align=left | Barangay Ginebra
| 22 || 26.0 || .455 || .200 || .754 || 6.1 || 2.0 || .5 || .3 || 8.5
|-
| align=left | 
| align=left | Barangay Ginebra
| 14 || 15.5 || .442 || .444 || .400 || 2.6 || .9 || .3 || .1 || 3.1
|-class=sortbottom
| align="center" colspan=2 | Career
| 184 || 13.8 || .460 || .214 || .638 || 3.2 || .9 || .3 || .1 || 4.1

References

1992 births
Living people
Barangay Ginebra San Miguel players
Filipino men's basketball players
Small forwards
UST Growling Tigers basketball players
San Beda University alumni
Power forwards (basketball)
People from Mandaluyong
Barangay Ginebra San Miguel draft picks